Rudolf Bruner-Dvořák (2 July 1864, Přelouč – 30 October 1921, Prague) was a Czech photographer of the late 19th and early 20th century. He was an important figure in Czech photojournalism and known for his use of Autochrome Lumière.

Biography
Bruner-Dvořák studied under Karl Teufel, and was named the official photographer to Franz Ferdinand in 1891. He died in Prague.

References

External links

1864 births
1921 deaths
People from Přelouč
Czech photographers
19th-century photographers
20th-century photographers